Ambres is one of 54 parishes in Cangas del Narcea, a municipality within the province and autonomous community of Asturias, in northern Spain.

Villages
Ambres is a populated place and its villages include: Ambres, Las Cuadrieḷḷas d'Ambres, Las Defradas d'Ambres and Ridera.

Parishes in Cangas del Narcea